Des/Amor (English: Un/Love) is the fifth studio album from Mexican Latin pop group Reik, released on June 17, 2016, through Sony Music Latin. The album received a nomination at the 17th Annual Latin Grammy Awards for Best Contemporary Pop Vocal Album and the Lo Nuestro Award for Pop Album of the Year.

Accolades

Track listing 
"Qué Gano Olvidándote" – 3:27
"Vámonos Lejos" – 3:30
"De Rodillas" – 3:31
"Voy a Olvidarte" – 3:17
"Spanglish" – 3:25
"Un Amor de Verdad" – 3:33
"Ya Me Enteré" – 3:22
"We Only Have Tonight" – 3:28
"Náufragos" – 2:58
"Al Fin Estás Aquí" (featuring Felix y Gil) – 3:16
"Ya Me Enteré" (featuring Nicky Jam) [urban version] – 3:39

Charts

Weekly charts

Year-end charts

Certifications

References

2016 albums
Albums produced by Cachorro López
Reik albums
Sony Music Latin albums